Digger is a 2020 Greek drama film directed by Greek director and screenwriter Georgis Grigorakis. It had its world premiere screening as part of the Panorama section at the 70th Berlin International Film Festival, where it won the independent jury International Confederation of Art Cinemas Art Cinema Award for Panorama 2020.

The film has been shown and nominated in international festivals around the world, winning 19 awards. It was nominated for 14 awards at the Hellenic Film Academy Awards and won ten awards, including Best Feature Film, Best Director, and Best Cinematography. It was selected as the Greek entry for the Best International Feature Film at the 94th Academy Awards.

Plot
Nikitas is a father who lives in rural northern Greece, where a mining company threatens the natural landscape and disturbs his daily life. His son, Johnny, visits unexpectedly after a 20-year absence, bringing a whole other tension to Nikitas' life, when he discovers his wife has died. His son now demands his half of his inheritance, causing tension.

Cast
 Vangelis Mourikis as Nikitas
 Argyris Pandazaras as Johnny
 Sofia Kokkali as Mary

Awards

See also
 List of submissions to the 94th Academy Awards for Best International Feature Film
 List of Greek submissions for the Academy Award for Best International Feature Film

References

External links
 

2020 films
2020 drama films
Greek drama films
2020s Greek-language films